Tarfaya ( - Ṭarfāya) is a coastal Moroccan town, located at the level of Cape Juby, in western Morocco, on the Atlantic coast. It is located about 890 km southwest of the capital Rabat, and around 100 km from Laayoune and Lanzarote, in the far east of the Canary Islands. During the colonial era, Tarfaya was a Spanish colony known as Villa Bens. It was unified with Morocco in 1958 after the Ifni War, which started one year after the independence of other regions of Morocco.

Tarfaya is the capital and main town in the Tarfaya Province, and counts a population of 8,027 inhabitants according to the 2014 census. Although founded in the twentieth century, the city has a big historical symbolic in the Moroccan history, dating back to the era of the Green March in November 1975.

The region of Tarfaya has been linked to relations with foreign powers, following several incursions conducted at its coasts (Spanish, Portuguese, British and French). This blending gave the city a special cultural dimension in its history. The famous French writer and aviator Antoine de Saint-Exupéry (1900-1944) lived in Tarfaya for two years (1927-1928) before writing his masterpiece The Little Prince that was later translated to more than 300 languages and dialects. He served as station manager here during his career as an airmail pilot. In 2004, the Antoine de Saint-Exupery Museum was opened in Tarfaya.

Tarfaya is home to a number of economic projects, including the largest wind farm in Africa, called Tarfaya Wind Farm, and Casamar, also known as Port Victoria, that was founded by the Scottish trader and traveler Donald McKenzie in 1882. It is the meeting area of Atlantic coast with stretching sand dunes.

Sebkha Tah, the lowest altitude point in Morocco (55 meters below sea level) is located in Tarfaya province. Tarfaya is also the closest city to the Khenifiss National Park, added to the UNESCO World Heritage Tentative list, an ecological site home to hundreds of different kinds of migratory birds each year. It is estimated that more than 20,000 birds from 211 different species breed, nest and feed regularly in the park.

History 

Tarfaya was occupied by the British in 1882, when they built a trading post called Casa del Mar. The building is currently in a state of complete disrepair. The Sahrawi tribes then solicited the intervention of Sultan Hassan I who negotiated the withdrawal of the British in 1895 by Treaty of Cape Juby. In 1912 the territory of Tarfaya, then named Cape Juby, was part of the Spanish Sahara. The greater Cape Juby region was unified with Morocco in 1958, at the end of the Ifni War. In December 2014 the Tarfaya Wind Farm, the largest wind farm in Africa, was commissioned.

Aéropostale 
Tarfaya's association with Aéropostale began in 1927. The airmail carrier, based in Toulouse, France, was founded by French industrialist Pierre-Georges Latécoère, who envisioned an air route connecting France to its French colonies in Africa. Latécoère firmly believed in the future of aviation as a means of commercial transportation and communication between people.

The nearby Cape Juby airfield was an important refueling and stopover station for Aéropostale. Author-aviator Antoine de Saint-Exupéry was named its station manager in 1927. There he remained for 18 months, on occasion negotiating with the rebellious Moorish tribes to release the imprisoned pilots, as he wrote in his first novel, Southern Mail.

On 28 September 2004 a museum opened in honour of the memory of Aéropostale, Saint-Exupéry and its pilots, as an initiative of the “Friends of Tarfaya Association”supported notably by the city of Toulouse and European aircraft maker Airbus. The museum was inaugurated by renowned aviation journalist Bernard Chabbert, whose father was also part of Aéropostale's history.

Air services 

The town maintains the Tarfaya Airport with the IATA code TFY.

Climate 
Tarfaya has a desert climate (BWh/BWk).

References 

Citations

Bibliography

 Didier Daurat, Saint-Exupéry tel que je l'ai connu, France: Édition Dynamo, 1954.

 
Populated places in Laâyoune-Sakia El Hamra
1882 establishments in the British Empire
Tarfaya